The 2013 Dubai Sevens was the second tournament within the 2013-2014 Sevens World Series. It was held over the weekend of 29–30 November 2013 at The Sevens Stadium in Dubai, United Arab Emirates.

Format
The teams were drawn into four pools of four teams each. Each team played everyone in their pool one time. The top two teams from each pool advanced to the Cup/Plate brackets. The bottom two teams from each group went to the Bowl/Shield brackets.

Teams

The participating teams and schedule were announced on 13 October 2013.

Pool Stage

Pool A

Pool B

Pool C

Pool D

Knockout stage

Shield

Bowl

Plate

Cup

References

External links

2013
2013–14 IRB Sevens World Series
2013 in Emirati sport
2013 in Asian rugby union